Luke Campbell is a British showrunner, executive producer, director, producer, writer, interviewer and narrator.
He's produced and directed over 30 TV documentaries such as the hit comedy travel documentary An Idiot Abroad, Gordon, Gino and Fred: Road Trip, OctoMom: Me & My 14 Kids, and Bodyshock – The Girl with Two Faces.

References

External links

British directors
British writers
Year of birth missing (living people)
Living people